Stokmarknes Airport is an airport in Hadsel Municipality in Nordland county, Norway. Widerøe is the only approved scheduled air carrier to operate from the airport, using Canadian-built De Havilland Canada Dash 8 STOL (short take-off and landing) aircraft. Other frequent traffic includes ambulance flights (MEDEVAC) using Beechcraft Super King Airs operated by Babcock Scandinavian Air Ambulance.

History 
The airport opened 1 July 1972 as part of a government program of building a series of small airports along the coast. This was a major success and an important step for the population in the area (Vesterålen archipelago), who now could travel to the bigger cities of Norway and the rest of the world in one day, not weeks. Currently owned and operated by Avinor, the airport was managed by the Hadsel municipality for the first 20 years.

Airlines and destinations

Statistics

Extension
Work on extending RESA and improving the strip around the runway was completed in 2006.
In March 2015, Avinor decided to postpone plans for extending the runway to 1199 meters.

References

Airports in Nordland
Airports in the Arctic
Avinor airports
Hadsel
1972 establishments in Norway
Airports established in 1972